Bank is a 2009 Indian multilingual heist film directed by Arun Kumar. Titled Bank in Telugu and Hindi, it is known as Vangi in Tamil. The film stars Jackie Shroff, Raghuvaran, Rahul Dev, Abbas and Veda. The Telugu version of the film was released on 30 January 2009.

Cast
Jackie Shroff
Raghuvaran
Rahul Dev 
Abbas
Veda
Pooja Bharathi
Sreedhar Rao
Baby Bhavana

Production
Arun Kumar revealed that he initially wanted to produce the film but felt that only he could envision the tale correctly, and subsequently chose to direct the venture himself. While producing the film through the newly launched Arun Entertainments, he also sets up his own music company, Arun Music. He introduced newcomer, Chinni Charan, to be the composer and lyricist. The director recruited an ensemble cast of Jackie Shroff, Raghuvaran, Rahul Dev, Abbas and Veda to star. Shroff noted that Arun Kumar did not know how to speak English when he met him for the script narration, but was convinced to sign the film owing to the director's enthusiasm. The film was shot in three languages, with the same actors appearing in the Tamil, Telugu and Hindi versions. Model Sreedhar Rao appeared in a guest role and a song in the film.

Production began during January 2007  and the film was mostly shot in Hyderabad and Mehaboob Studios in Mumbai. An audio soundtrack release event was held in Hyderabad during November 2007. The event was presided over by the Telugu Film Producers' Council President Tammareddy Bharadwaja.

Soundtrack

Release
The Telugu version of the film had a theatrical release on 30 January 2009. A critic from The Times of India gave the film one star out of five, and noted, "it remains a big question, how talented actors like Jackie Shroff and Raghuvaran could agree to do this lackluster film". The reviewer added, "on the face of it, a plot on bank robbery promises to be a nail-biting thriller, but the shoddy screenplay makes it a bad show". A critic from TMDB stated "the film fell flat on its face solely due to the poor logic and the absolutely bizarre aspects of the story", adding that "while the first half goes about sketching the looting plan and the aftermath, the second half goes on with the torture done to the inmates of the house and also to the audience".

The Tamil version of the film was released straight to DVD in 2012. The Hindi version of the film was scheduled to release in September 2008 after delays, but was not released.

References

External links

2009 films
Indian multilingual films
Indian action thriller films
Indian heist films
Films about organised crime in India
2000s Tamil-language films
2000s Hindi-language films
2000s Telugu-language films
2009 directorial debut films
2009 thriller films
2009 multilingual films